KLFZ (102.3 FM) is a terrestrial American radio station, airing a Spanish language Christian format branded as "Fuzíon". Licensed to Jacksonville, Texas, United States, the station is owned by the Educational Radio Foundation of East Texas. KLFZ trimulcasts programming with its sister stations 103.1 KHFZ Pittsburg. which in combination with KLFZ serves a majority of the measured Tyler-Longview market, as well as 97.7 KGFZ  Burke, serving Lufkin-Nacogdoches and the Piney Woods of Deep East Texas.

History
The station was assigned call sign KSIZ on 1991-02-22. On 1998-01-20, the station changed its call sign to KLJT. In 2008, the station flipped to a Top 40 (CHR) format with programming from the Hits Now! network while retaining "The Breeze" moniker.

On August 1, 2016, KLJT and sister stations KFRO-FM, KMPA, and KZXM were taken off the air and the staff of those stations were let go and locked out without warning by Susie Waller, the daughter of the deceased owner of the station, Dudley Waller. The website remained active through mid-August, but it was redirected to a "WordPress For Broadcasters" page due to the aforementioned lockout of staff, plus it could no longer stream any live broadcasts. The staff for "The Morning Madhouse" show apologized and thanked their listeners as well as explaining the incident in detail on the show's Facebook page.

On February 17, 2017, Waller Broadcasting filed for an extension of the Special Temporary Authority allowing KLJT and its three sisters to remain silent for an additional 180 days. The application also stated that a buyer had been found for the stations, and was expected to announce a deal to transfer the four stations' licenses, pending F.C.C. approval, within the next 30 days.

On July 3, 2017, East Texas Results Group (operated by Paul Coates and Mike Huckabee) began its temporary lease of KLJT & KFRO-FM from Dorothy Waller, and relaunched the CHR format as Fun Radio after being absent from the airwaves for almost a year.

On October 31, 2017, the license transfer was granted by the Federal Communications Commission for KLJT and its three sister stations, KFRO-FM, KMPA, and KZXM. The deal was consummated on March 8, 2018, at a purchase price of $1.2 million.

On June 10, 2019, East Texas Results Media filed to transfer the license of KLJT and its three sister stations to Educational Radio Foundation of East Texas, who in turn applied to turn all four facilities non-commercial. The Foundation broadcasts Christian programming.

KLJT featured a Top 40 playlist branded as Fun! 95.3/102.3 prior to the sale of the facility to Educational Radio Foundation of East Texas, simulcasted on sister station 95.3 KFRO-FM Gilmer. The station broadcast in HD radio until it went silent in July 2019.

"Fun 95.3 & 102.3" left the air in mid-July 2019, pending transfer of the facility's license.

The sale of KLJT and its three sister stations was consummated on October 8, 2019, with ERFET officially taking control of the licenses and facilities.

Educational Radio Foundation of East Texas announced that they would launch a full service Spanish language Christian format on both KLJT and KMPA. The new format launched in January 2020, as announced in late October 2019.

The station changed its call sign to KLFZ on July 22, 2022.

References

External links

LFZ
LFZ
Radio stations established in 1993
1993 establishments in Texas